Louis Charles Frank Thuman (December 13, 1916 – December 19, 2000) was an American professional baseball player who played in five games for the Washington Senators during the  and  seasons.

After his playing days, Thurman served in the military during World War II from 1941 to 1945.

He was born in Baltimore, Maryland and died there at the age of 84.

References

External links

Major League Baseball pitchers
Baseball players from Baltimore
Washington Senators (1901–1960) players
1916 births
2000 deaths